The Rosarito Beach Formation is a geologic formation in the Playas de Rosarito Municipality of Baja California state, northwestern Mexico.

It preserves fossils dating back to the Neogene period.

See also 
 
 List of fossiliferous stratigraphic units in Mexico

External links 
 

Neogene Mexico
Geography of Baja California
Playas de Rosarito Municipality
Natural history of Baja California
Geologic formations of Mexico